Piletocera denticostalis is a moth in the family Crambidae. It was described by George Hampson in 1907. It is found on Ghizo Island in the Solomon Islands.

References

denticostalis
Endemic fauna of the Solomon Islands
Moths of the Solomon islands
Moths described in 1907
Taxa named by George Hampson